The 1955–56 season was Blackpool F.C.'s 48th season (45th consecutive) in the Football League. They competed in the 22-team Division One, then the top tier of English football, finishing second, their highest finish in the English league system to date, despite losing their final four League games.

Jackie Mudie was the club's top scorer, with 22 goals in all competitions.

Table

Notes

References

Blackpool F.C.
Blackpool F.C. seasons